On 14 February 1779, English explorer Captain James Cook attempted to kidnap Kalaniʻōpuʻu, the ruling chief (aliʻi nui) of the island of Hawaii. The decision to hold him in exchange for a stolen longboat was the fatal error of Cook's final voyage, and led to his death at Kealakekua Bay.

Cook's arrival in Hawaii was eventually followed by mass migrations of Europeans and Americans to the islands that gave rise to the overthrow of the Kingdom of Hawaii, the Aboriginal monarchy of the islands, by pro-American elements beginning in 1893.

Arrival
James Cook led three separate voyages to chart areas of the globe unknown to the Kingdom of Great Britain. It was on his third and final voyage that he encountered what are known today as the Islands of Hawaii. He first sighted the islands on 18 January 1778. He anchored off the west coast of the island of Kauai near Waimea and met inhabitants to trade and obtain water and food. 

On 2 February 1778, Cook continued on to the coast of North America and Alaska, mapping and searching for a Northwest Passage to the Atlantic Ocean for approximately nine months. He returned to the island chain to resupply, initially exploring the coasts of Maui and the Big Island of Hawaii and trading with locals, then making anchor in Kealakekua Bay in January 1779. Cook and his crew were initially welcomed and treated with honour, as his arrival coincided with the Makahiki season, an ancient New Year festival in honour of the god Lono of the Hawaiian religion, and a celebration of the yearly harvest. The idea or suggestion that the Native Hawaiians considered Cook to be the god Lono himself is considered to be inaccurate and is attributed to William Bligh. It is conceivable that some Hawaiians may have used the name of Lono as a metaphor when describing Cook or other possible explanations other than Hawaiians simply assuming the explorer was their own deity.

Although Cook's sequential visits may have coincided with native traditional seasons, the natives had soured on Cook and his men by the time of Cook's initial departure. John Ledyard was the only American aboard Cook's ship during this time. Ledyard was present during the events leading up to and during Cook's death, and wrote a detailed account of the events in his journals.

During Cook's initial visit, he attempted to barter with the Hawaiians and ordered his men to remove the wood used to border the natives' sacred "Morai" burial ground, used for high-ranking individuals and depictions of their gods. Ledyard says in his journals that Cook offered some iron hatchets for the wooden border around the Morai and when the dismayed and insulted chiefs refused, Cook proceeded to give orders to ascend the Morai, chop down the fence and load the boats with the wood. John Ledyard also tells of an episode where Captain Charles Clerke accused a native chieftain of stealing the Resolution'''s jolly boat. However, the boat was soon found and the native chief was incensed by the accusation. After staying in the bay for 19 days, Cook and his two ships sailed out of the bay.

On 6 February Cook's ships left Kealakekua Bay. They were soon met with an unexpected hard gale which wrenched the mainmast of the Resolution. On 11 February, the Resolution returned again to Kealakekua Bay to make repairs. Ledyard writes on 13 February:

Our return to this bay was as disagreeable to us as it was to the inhabitants, for we were reciprocally tired of each other. They had been oppressed and were weary of our prostituted alliance...It was also equally evident from the looks of the natives as well as every other appearance that our friendship was now at an end, and that we had nothing to do but to hasten our departure to some different island where our vices were not known, and where our intrinsic virtues might gain us another short space of being wondered at.

While the Resolution was anchored in Kealakekua Bay, one of its two longboats was stolen from the ship by the Hawaiians, testing the foreigners' reaction to see how far they could go with such a significant loss. To try to obtain the return of the "stolen" longboat from the Hawaiians, Cook attempted to kidnap the aliʻi nui of the island of Hawaii, Kalaniʻōpuʻu. Possibly being quite sick at this point, Cook made what were later described as a series of incredibly poor decisions.

Attempt to take the aliʻi nui hostage

On the morning of 14 February 1779, Cook and his men launched from Resolution along with a company of armed marines. They went directly to the ruling chief's enclosure where Kalaniʻōpuʻu was still sleeping. They woke him and directed him, urgently but without threat, to come with them. As Cook and his men marched the ruler out of the royal enclosure, Cook himself held the hands of the elder chief as they walked away from the town toward the beach. Kalaniʻōpuʻu's favorite wife, Kānekapōlei, saw them as they were leaving and yelled after her husband but he ignored her and did not stop. She called to the other chiefs and the townspeople to alert them to the departure of her husband. Two chiefs, Kanaʻina (Kalaimanokahoʻowaha), the young son of the former ruler, Keaweʻopala, and Nuaa, the king's personal attendant, followed the group to the beach with the king's wife behind them pleading along the way for the aliʻi nui to stop and come back.

By the time they got to the beach, Kalaniʻōpuʻu's two youngest sons, who had been following their father believing they were being invited to visit the ship again with the ruler, began to climb into the boats waiting at the shore. Kānekapōlei shouted to them to get out of the boat and pleaded with her husband to stop. The ruler then realized that Cook and his men were not asking him to visit the ship, but were attempting to abduct him. At this point he stopped and sat down.

Death of Cook
Cook's men were confronted on the beach by an elderly kahuna who approached them holding a coconut and chanting. They yelled at the priest to go away, but he kept approaching them while singing the mele. When Cook and his men looked away from the old kahuna, they saw that the beach was now filled with thousands of Native Hawaiians. Cook told Kalaniʻōpuʻu to get up but the ruler refused. As the townspeople began to gather around them, Cook and his men began to back away from the hostile crowd and raise their guns. The two chiefs and Kānekapōlei shielded the aliʻi nui as Cook tried to get him to his feet.

Kanaʻina angrily approached Cook, who reacted by striking the chief with the broad (flat) side of his sword. Kanaʻina jumped at Cook and grabbed him. Some accounts state that Kanaʻina did not intend to hit Cook while other descriptions say the chief deliberately struck the navigator across the head with his leiomano. Either way, Kanaʻina pushed Cook, who fell to the sand. As Cook attempted to get up, Nuaa lunged at him and fatally stabbed him in the chest with a metal dagger, obtained by trade from Cook's ship during the same visit. Cook fell with his face in the water. This caused a violent, close-quarters melee between the Hawaiians and Cook's men.

Four of the Royal Marines (Corporal James Thomas and Privates Theophilus Hinks, Thomas Fachett, and John Allen) were killed and two were wounded. The remaining sailors and marines, heavily outnumbered, continued to fire as they retreated to their small boat and rowed back to their ship, killing several of the angered people on the beach, including possibly High Chief Kanaʻina. Cook's ships did not leave Kealakekua Bay until 22 February; they had remained for another week to continue repair of the mast and collect better-quality drinking water.

See alsoDeath of Cook'', several paintings
List of kidnappings

References

1779 crimes in Oceania
1779 in Hawaii
Ancient Hawaii
Battles involving Great Britain
Battles involving Hawaii
Conflicts in 1779
History of Hawaii
James Cook
Kidnappings